Leon A. Viau (July 5, 1866 – December 17, 1947) was a professional baseball player who played pitcher in the Major Leagues from 1888 to 1892. Viau played for the Cincinnati Red Stockings/Reds, Cleveland Spiders, Louisville Colonels, and Boston Beaneaters.

References

External links

1866 births
1947 deaths
People from Corinth, Vermont
Major League Baseball pitchers
Cincinnati Red Stockings (AA) players
Cincinnati Reds players
Cleveland Spiders players
Louisville Colonels players
Boston Beaneaters players
Minor league baseball managers
19th-century baseball players
Baseball players from Vermont
St. Paul Saints (Northwestern League) players
Torrington Tornadoes players
Paterson Silk Weavers players
Paterson Weavers players
Worcester Farmers players
Utica Pentups players
Binghamton Bingos players
Binghamton Crickets (1880s) players
Newark Colts players
Troy Washerwomen players
Troy Trojans (minor league) players
Providence Grays (minor league) players
Montreal Royals players
Binghamton Bingoes players
Braddock Infants players
Wilkes-Barre Barons (baseball) players
Ilion Typewriters players